"Black Flag" is a song by the American progressive metal band King's X. It was released as a single in support of their 1992 self-titled album.

Track listing 
US CD promo single (PRCD 4461-2)
"Black Flag" (Jerry Gaskill, Doug Pinnick, Ty Tabor) – 4:01

Charts

Personnel
Adapted from the Black Flag liner notes.

King's X
 Jerry Gaskill – drums, percussion
 Doug Pinnick – lead vocals, bass
 Ty Tabor – guitar

Production and additional personnel
 Steve Ames – engineering
 Tony Dawsey – mastering
 Sam Taylor – production

Release history

References

External links 
 Black Flag at Discogs (list of releases)

1992 songs
1992 singles
King's X songs
Songs written by Jerry Gaskill
Songs written by Doug Pinnick
Songs written by Ty Tabor
Atlantic Records singles